Paralucia is a  genus of butterflies endemic to  Australia and belonging to the family Lycaenidae. The caterpillars feed on Bursaria and sometimes Pittosporum species and co-habit with ants of the genera Anonychomyrma and Notoncus.

Species
The genus includes the following three species:

 Bright copper, Paralucia aurifera
 Fiery copper, Paralucia pyrodiscus
 Bathurst copper, Paralucia spinifera

References

External links

List of host plants for Graphium macleayanus. Australian Biological Resources Study.

 
Luciini
Lycaenidae genera
Taxonomy articles created by Polbot